Alexander Gustav Abraham Steglitz (January 17, 1886 – February 1971) was a German track and field athlete, born in Berlin and died in  East Berlin, who competed in the 1912 Summer Olympics. In 1912 he participated in the decathlon competition but retired after four events. He competed for SC Komet Berlin during his sporting career and later worked as both a sports teacher/lecturer at the Deutscher Sportbund für Athletik as well as a chief coach for skiing and track and field in Turkey from 1928-36.

References

Sources
 
 list of German athletes

1886 births
1971 deaths
Athletes from Berlin
German decathletes
Olympic athletes of Germany
Athletes (track and field) at the 1912 Summer Olympics
Olympic decathletes